William E. Search was an American football coach.  He served as the head football coach at Colorado State Teachers College—now known as the University of Northern Colorado—in Greeley, Colorado for three seasons, from 1919 to 1921, compiling a record of 1–10–1.

References

Year of birth missing
Year of death missing
Northern Colorado Bears football coaches